Pterolophia pilosella is a species of beetle in the family Cerambycidae. It was described by Francis Polkinghorne Pascoe in 1865.

References

pilosella
Beetles described in 1865